Sekhon is a Jat clan in the Punjab region, especially found in Amritsar and Ludhiana districts of Punjab and Jind district of Haryana in India, and in the Gujranwala district of Pakistan.

Notable people with the surname Sekhon
 Nirmal Jit Singh Sekhon, Indian Air Force officer
 Sahaij Sekhon, Indian basketball player
 Sant Singh Sekhon, Indian playwright
 Janmeja Singh Sekhon, Indian politician
 Kathleen Sekhon, American educator and politician
 Harrobindeep Sekhon, Canadian cricketer
 Jasjeet S. Sekhon, Canadian statistician
 Ricky Sekhon, English actor
 Gurcharan Singh Sekhon, Singaporean Army officer
 Harinder Singh Sekhon, Malaysian cricketer
 Shweta Sekhon, Malaysian supermodel

Popular culture
 DSP Dilsher Sekhon of Singham Khurd  in the Punjabi language film Singham, who sets out to end the drug addiction among the youth of Punjab.

References

Further reading 
 

Jat clans
Punjabi tribes